Wall of Tears may refer to:
 Wall of Tears (Galápagos Islands), a stone wall built by forced labour in a penal colony
 "Wall of Tears" (song), a 1986 single by K. T. Oslin
 Wall of Tears, a feature on Mount Waialeale, a volcano in Hawaii